Mathew Erpelding (born January 10, 1975) is an American politician who served as a member of the Idaho House of Representatives from the from 2012 until 2019. Erpelding also served as House Minority Leader from January 2017 until his December 2019 resignation.

Early life and education 
Erpelding was born in Denver. From 1993 to 1997, Erpelding attended Idaho State University, in Pocatello, graduating with a BA in psychology. He later earned a master's degree in adult education and organizational learning from the University of Idaho.

Career
Rep. Erpelding co-owns Idaho Mountain Guides serving as the head guide and instructor. Additionally, he teaches at Boise State University in the College of Innovation and Design as an adjunct instructor for the LEAD certification.

Prior to his election in 2012, Rep. Erpelding was a social and behavioral sciences instructor at the College of Western Idaho. An accomplished mountain guide, Erpelding has guided mountains across the western United States, most notably summiting Denali (20.310 ft) four times.

During the 2012 session of the Idaho Legislature, Erpelding served as an aide for Representative Brian Cronin (D-Boise). He has also been vice chair of the Ada County Democratic Party.

In 2003 Erpelding founded Experiential Adventures LLC, which offers "clients hands on leadership experience in fun and progressive learning environments."

In December 2019, Erpelding resigned from the Idaho House to take a position with the Boise Metro Chamber of Commerce.

Elections
Erpelding was elected as the Idaho House of Representatives Minority Leader by the House Democratic Caucus in December 2016.

2016

Erpelding was unopposed in the Democratic Primary. Erpelding defeated Republican Mark Patten with 68.75% of the vote.

2014

Erpelding was unopposed in the Democratic Primary. Erpelding defeated Republican Mitchell Berger with 71.6% of the vote.

2012

When Democratic Representative Cherie Buckner-Webb ran for Idaho Senate, Erpelding won the three-way May 15, 2012 Democratic Primary with 1,449 votes (48.0%).

Erpelding won the November 6, 2012 General election with 14,695 votes (66.7%) against Republican nominee Mike Washburn.

References

External links
Official page at the Idaho Legislature
Campaign site

1975 births
21st-century American politicians
American mountain climbers
Boise State University faculty
Idaho State University alumni
Living people
Democratic Party members of the Idaho House of Representatives
People from Boise, Idaho
People from Denver
University of Idaho alumni